Heinz Golinski (11 July 1919 – 16 October 1942) was a German fighter pilot in the Luftwaffe during World War II and a recipient of the Knight's Cross of the Iron Cross.

Golinski was born on 11 July 1919 in Nordstemmen and was posted as an Unteroffizier to 3./Jagdgeschwader 53 (JG 53) in the autumn of 1941, operating over the German Bight and over Malta. He then served as a test pilot with Messerschmitt. In August 1942, Golinski joined I./JG 53 on the Eastern Front. He claimed his first victory on 28 July 1942, an R-5 biplane. During August, he claimed 17 victories. Golinski claimed 27 victories in September. In late September, I./JG 53 transferred to the Mediterranean.

On 16 October 1942, Golinski shot down a Spitfire. However, another Spitfire attacked him and his Bf 109 G-2 crashed killing Golinski. It is thought Golinski was the victim of Canadian ace F/L Henry Wallace "Wally" McLeod of No. 1435 Squadron RCAF. Golinski was posthumously awarded the Deutsches Kreuz in Gold on 5 November, and the Ritterkreuz on 30 December.

Awards
 Ehrenpokal der Luftwaffe on 26 October 1942 as Unteroffizier and pilot
 German Cross in Gold on 5 November 1942 as Unteroffizier in the I./JG 53
 Knight's Cross of the Iron Cross on 30 December 1942 (posthumous) as Unteroffizier and pilot in the 3./JG 53

References

Citations

Bibliography

1921 births
1942 deaths
Luftwaffe  personnel killed in World War II
German World War II flying aces
Luftwaffe pilots
Recipients of the Gold German Cross
Recipients of the Knight's Cross of the Iron Cross
Military personnel from Lower Saxony
Aviators killed by being shot down
People from Hildesheim (district)